Oliver Joseph Cooper (born 14 December 1999) is a Welsh footballer who currently plays as a midfielder for Swansea City.

Career

Swansea City
Cooper joined the Swansea youth academy as a U12, and signed his first professional contract with the club in February 2019. Cooper made his professional debut with Swansea in a 2-0 FA Cup win over Stevenage on 9 January 2021. He scored his first goal for Swansea on 23 January 2021 in a 5–1 win over Nottingham Forest in the FA Cup fourth round.

Newport County (loan)
On 31 August 2021, Cooper joined League Two side Newport County on a season-long loan deal, with the option of him returning to his parent club in January 2022. He made his debut for Newport the same day in the starting line-up for the 2–0 win against Plymouth Argyle in the EFL Trophy. Cooper scored his first goal for Newport on 2 October 2021 in the 3-0 League Two win against Scunthorpe United.

International
Oli Cooper is a Wales Under-21 international. In November 2022 Cooper and Jordan James were named as travelling back-up players to the senior Wales squad for the 2022 World Cup in Qatar.

Personal life
Oli Cooper is the son of the retired footballer, coach and manager Kevin Cooper.

Career statistics

References

External links
 
 Swansea City Profile

1999 births
Living people
Welsh footballers
Wales youth international footballers
Welsh people of English descent
English Football League players
Association football midfielders
Swansea City A.F.C. players
Newport County A.F.C. players